Lukar may refer to:

 Lukar, Serbia, a village near Jagodina
 Lukar, Croatia, a village in the Promina municipality